better known by her ring name  is a Japanese professional wrestler currently working for the Japanese promotions Tokyo Joshi Pro Wrestling and DDT Pro Wrestling.

Professional wrestling career

Independent circuit (2014–present)

Tokyo Joshi Pro Wrestling (2014–present)
Ishizawa made her professional wrestling debut at Shibuya Entertainment Fight 1, an event promoted by Tokyo Joshi Pro Wrestling (TJPW) on January 28, 2014 under the name of   where she fell short to Shoko Nakajima. On January 4, 2021 at Tokyo Joshi Pro '21, Ishizawa defeated Yuka Sakazaki to win the Princess of Princess Championship for the first time. On May 4, at Yes! Wonderland 2021: We Are Still In The Middle Of Our Dreams, Tatsumi dropped the title to Miyu Yamashita, ending her reign at 120 days. On March 18, 2023, at Grand Princess '23, Tatsumi defeated Miu Watanabe to win the International Princess Championship for the first time, and became TJPW's first ever Grand Slam winner.

DDT Pro Wrestling (2015–present)
Due to TJPW being in direct partnership with DDT Pro-Wrestling (DDT), Ishizawa worked in various events of the latter. At CyberFight Festival 2021, a cross-over event promoted by TJPW, DDT and Pro Wrestling Noah on June 6, she teamed up with her "Hakuchumu" tag team partner Miu Watanabe and unsuccessfully challenged Shoko Nakajima and Hyper Misao, and Bakuretsu Sisters (Nodoka Tenma and Yuki Aino) in a three-way tag team match.

She also worked in the DDT Peter Pan branch of events. At Ryōgoku Peter Pan 2017 on August 20, she participated in a Rumble rules match for the Ironman Heavymetalweight Championship also involving Yuu, Mizuki, Tetsuya Koda and others. At Wrestle Peter Pan 2019 on July 15, she teamed up with Bakuretsu Sisters (Nodoka Tenma and Yuki Aino) to defeat Natsumi Maki, Yuna Manase and Himawari Unagi in a Six-woman tag team match. On the second night of Wrestle Peter Pan 2020 from June 7, she teamed up with Bakuretsu Sisters (Nodoka Tenma and Yuki Aino) in a losing effort to MiraClians (Yuka Sakazaki and Shoko Nakajima) and Miyu Yamashita.

As for the DDT Ultimate Party series, she made an appearance Ultimate Party 2019 on November 3 she teamed up with Miu Watanabe and defeated NEO Biishiki-gun (Sakisama and Misao) to win the Princess Tag Team Championship.

Another branch of events in which she worked was DDT Judgement. She made her first appearance at Judgement 2017: DDT 20th Anniversary on March 20 where she teamed up with Reika Saiki and Azusa Takigawa in a losing effort to Yuu, Mil Clown and Maki Itoh. At Judgement 2018: DDT 21st Anniversary on March 25, she teamed up with Maho Kurone in a losing effort to MiraClians (Yuka Sakazaki and Shoko Nakajima).

Championships and accomplishments
DDT Pro-Wrestling
Ironman Heavymetalweight Championship (1 time)
Tokyo Joshi Pro Wrestling
Princess of Princess Championship (1 time)
Princess Tag Team Championship (1 time) – with Miu Watanabe
International Princess Championship (1 time, current)
"Futari wa Princess" Max Heart Tournament (2022) – with Miu Watanabe
 First TJPW Triple Crown Champion
 First TJPW Grand Slam Champion

References 

Living people
Japanese female professional wrestlers
People from Nagano Prefecture
Year of birth missing (living people)
21st-century professional wrestlers
Ironman Heavymetalweight Champions